Emmanuel Victor Osodeke is a Nigerian Professor of Soil Science at Michael Okpara University of Agriculture, Umudike, who is also the national president of Academic Staff Union of Universities. He served as vice president of the union in the previous term.

Early life and education
Osodeke was born in Kokori, Ethiope east local government of Delta State. He got his BSc from Rivers State University of Science and Technology in 1987, and a Master of Science from the University of Ibadan in 1989. He got his Postgraduate Diploma in Agro-meteorology from the Israeli Institute of Meteorology in 1994, and in 2002, he got his PhD from Michael Okpara University of Agriculture in Umudike.

Career
Osodeke was a lecturer at Delta State University, Abraka, he was also the chairman of Academic Staff Union of Universities in Michael Okpara University of Agriculture, Umudike. He is a visiting professor at the University of Calabar and University of Cape Cost, Ghana. On 30 May 2021 he was elected national president of the Academic Staff Union of Universities.

Personal life
Osodeke is married to Onome Osodeke and they have four children.

References

Living people
People from Delta State
Year of birth missing (living people)